The Journal of Disability Policy Studies is a quarterly peer-reviewed academic journal that covers the field of disability studies, including issues in ethics, public policy, and the law related to individuals with disabilities. The editors-in-chief are Mitchell Yell (University of South Carolina) and James G. Shriner (University of Illinois). It was established in 1990 and is currently published by SAGE Publications in association with the Hammill Institute on Disabilities.

Abstracting and indexing 
The Journal of Disability Policy Studies is abstracted and indexed in:
 CINAHL
 Contents Pages in Education
 EBSCO Nursing and Allied Health Collection
 Educational Research Abstracts Online
 Elsevier BIOBASE
 EMCare
 PAIS International
 PsycINFO
 Scopus
 Sociological Abstracts

According to the Journal Citation Reports, its 2017 impact factor is 1.104, ranking it 47 out of 69 journals in the category "Rehabilitation".

References

External links 
 
 Hammill Institute official website

SAGE Publishing academic journals
Disability studies
English-language journals
Sociology journals
Quarterly journals
Publications established in 1990
Disability publications